Gerlache Inlet is an inlet  wide in the northwest corner of Terra Nova Bay, indenting the Northern Foothills just south of Mount Browning, along the coast of Victoria Land, Antarctica. The name appears to have been applied by the British National Antarctic Expedition, 1901–04, and honors Belgian Antarctic explorer Lieutenant Adrien de Gerlache.

References

Inlets of Antarctica
Landforms of Victoria Land
Scott Coast